The Danish Cup (often referred to as Pokalen) is the official "knockout" cup competition in Danish football, run by the Danish Football Association. The cup has been contested annually since 1955.

The winner will qualify for the UEFA Europa League tournament the following year, where they (as of the 2009–10 season) will enter in the third qualifying round.

The latest edition, 2017-18 Danish Cup, was won by Superliga-side Brøndby, beating Superliga-side Silkeborg 3–1 on 10 May 2018 at Parken Stadium, thereby winning their first domestic trophy since 2008.

The final traditionally takes place on Kristi Himmelfarts Dag (The Ascension) and it is always played in the Danish national stadium Parken. However in the 1991 and 1992 seasons the final had been rescheduled to Odense Stadion and Århus Stadion respectively due to the renovation of Parken. Furthermore, in 2011, because Ascension Thursday fell on 2 June and an international match date was already allotted for this date, the Danish Cup final was played two weeks earlier on 22 May, which coincided with the annual Copenhagen Marathon.

The club with most final appearances is AGF with 12 finals, having won 9 of them.

Attention has been brought to the fact that the final on most occasions unpractically is played before the last rounds of the league, which can open up for speculation in the benefit of losing league games at the end of the season especially for the cup runner-up if the winner is heading for the league championship. Recently former AaB player David Nielsen claimed in his autobiography that after losing the cup final in 2004 to FC Copenhagen, he deliberately missed opportunities to score against them when AaB and FC Copenhagen met in the final league match because FCK would win the championship (and thereby the double) and land AaB in the UEFA Cup as losing cup finalists.

Sponsorship 
The Danish FA sanctioned nation-wide cup tournament has been sponsored since the 1990.

Format

Each club may only have one team in the tournament (their first team). If a match (except one of the two-legged semifinals, except if the 2nd match's result gives an aggregate tie, including the away goals rule) ends in a tie, two fifteen-minute extra time periods will be played, with penalty kicks if the tie remains after the extra time.

The participants
The teams are not seeded, but the lowest placed team from the previous season will always get the home pitch advantage.

Until 2005/06
1st round, 64 teams
48 teams qualified through preliminary cups held by the regional associations.
16 teams from the 2nd division (all teams)
2nd round, 32+8 teams
32 teams from the 1st round (winners)
8 teams from the 1st division (9th–16th placed)
3rd round, 20+8 teams
20 teams from the 2nd round
6 teams from the 1st division (3rd–8th placed)
2 teams from the Superliga (11th–12th, the relegated teams which are now in the 1st division)
4th round, 14+6 teams
14 teams from the 3rd round
4 teams from the Superliga (7th–10th)
2 teams from the 1st division (1st–2nd, the promoted teams which are now in the Superliga)
5th round, 10+6 teams
10 teams from the 4th round
6 teams from the Superliga (1st–6th)
Quarterfinals, 8 teams
8 teams from the 5th round
– and so on until the finals.

From 2006/07
1st round, 88 teams
48 teams qualified through preliminary cups held by the regional associations.
28 teams from the 2nd divisions (all teams)
12 teams from the 1st division (5th–16th placed)
2nd round, 44+12 teams
44 teams from the 1st round (winners)
4 teams from the 1st division (1st–4th placed)
8 teams from the Superliga (5th–12th placed).
3rd round, 28+4 teams
28 teams from the 2nd round
4 teams from the Superliga (1st–4th placed)
4th round, 16 teams
16 teams from the 3rd round
Quarterfinals, 8 teams
8 teams from the 4th round
– and so on until the finals.

From 2021/22
1st round, 92 teams
4 teams qualified through preliminary cups held by the regional associations.
12 teams from the 3rd divisions 
12 teams from the 2nd divisions 
12 teams from the 1st division 
2nd round, 58+6 teams
44 teams from the 1st round (winners)
6 teams from the Superliga (5th–12th placed).
3rd round, 28+4 teams
26 teams from the 2nd round
6 teams from the Superliga (1st–6th placed)
4th round, 16 teams
16 teams from the 3rd round
Quarterfinals, 8 teams
8 teams from the 4th round
– and so on until the finals.

Finals

Results by team

Footnotes

References

External links
Page on the website of the DBU 
Cup at UEFA
Denmark - List of Cup Finals, RSSSF.com
Danish Cup summary(SOCCERWAY)

 
1
Denmark